Plestiodon colimensis, the Colima skink, is a species of lizard which is endemic to Mexico.

References

colimensis
Reptiles of Mexico
Reptiles described in 1935
Taxa named by Edward Harrison Taylor